103rd meridian may refer to:

103rd meridian east, a line of longitude east of the Greenwich Meridian
103rd meridian west, a line of longitude west of the Greenwich Meridian